John Armstrong (born 5 September 1936) is a Scottish former professional footballer, who played as a goalkeeper. He played for Barrow, Nottingham Forest, Portsmouth and Southport.

Playing career
Born in Airdrie, Armstrong joined Barrow from Bellshill Athletic in March 1958. He joined Nottingham Forest nine months later, but could not establish himself in the first team. Portsmouth stepped in and signed him for about £6,000 in February 1963. He joined Southport in 1967.

References

External links
 

1936 births
Barrow A.F.C. players
Portsmouth F.C. players
Nottingham Forest F.C. players
Southport F.C. players
Living people
Footballers from Airdrie, North Lanarkshire
Association football goalkeepers
Bellshill Athletic F.C. players
English Football League players
Scottish footballers